Udyavara is an ancient port town located 5 km south of Udupi in the Indian state of Karnataka.Jayalaxmi Silks,one of the most famous stand-alone shopping stores in entire Karnataka is situated here.

Udyavara is gradually becoming a Udupi suburb. National Highway 17, now NH 66, passes through the village.

The river Papanashini flows from east to west and turns north to separate Udyavara and Malpe. The river hosts several islets and its waters are navigable.

History 

Udyavara has a rich history, dating from the 3rd and 4th centuries BCE. Test excavations yielded pottery from around that time, and what is perhaps the earliest information about the Jaina Santaras, rulers of Hombuchcha, have been obtained from this place.

Udyavara was one of the earliest capitals of the Alupa dynasty. It was a source of conflict between two factions of the family, becoming a battleground during the 8th and 9th centuries AD. Numerous inscriptions have been reported, providing the earliest epigraphical information about them. During this period Udyavara had two fortifications. The inner wall enclosed a palace, while the outer wall enclosed the town. During the late medieval period the administration of this town was under the Portuguese colony .

The city lost much of its heritage to modern development. Remnants of fort walls, temples and inscriptions document Udyavara's ancient glory.

HOLY PLACES
 Veera Bhadra Durgaparameshwari
 Siddhi Vinayaka Temple
 Siddiq -E-Akbar Jamia Masjid,
 UBM Christha Shanthi Church,
 ST.Francis Xavier church
 Shambu kallu Shiva Temple
 Sri Veera Vittala Temple: Situated in Matadangadi, is one of the oldest temples from GSB community in Udupi.

Education 
B.E.M Primary school ,
Hindu Primary School and St Francis Xavier school are in the village.

An Ayurveda college is located nearby the village.

Tourist attractions 

Tourist attractions include Udyavara river and Pithrody beach.

References

External links
Travel to Udyavara

Villages in Udupi district